The South Bay Correctional Facility  is a private state prison for men located in South Bay, Palm Beach County, Florida, which is operated by GEO Group under contract with the Florida Department of Corrections.  This facility was opened in 1997 and has a maximum capacity of 1948 prisoners.  

In September 2012, a jury awarded a South Bay inmate a $1.2 million settlement for the loss of an eye during a fight with another inmate.

Notable inmates
Joel Faviere - American musician and former lead singer of Get Scared - sentenced to 12 years for child pornography charges and registered as a sex offender. Faviere's release will be September 16, 2029.
Curtis Jones - Youngest person tried as an adult for murder at the time of his conviction. Released in 2015.

References

Prisons in Florida
Buildings and structures in Palm Beach County, Florida
GEO Group
1997 establishments in Florida